Nazok-e Sofla (also Romanized as Nāzok-e Soflá; also known as Nāzīk-e Soflá and Nāzok-e Pā’īn) is a village in Gejlarat-e Gharbi Rural District, Aras District, Poldasht County, West Azerbaijan Province, Iran. At the 2006 census, its population was 435, in 117 families.

References 

Populated places in Poldasht County